Vojislav "Voja" Dragović (Serbian Cyrillic: Bojиcлaв Дpaгoвић; born October 15, 1982 in Belgrade) is a Serbian former football goalkeeper.

Since 2005 he works as a football agent. Since then, he presided over a number of player transfers in European club football, mostly Italy, England and Spain. He also participated in numerous transfers of foreign personnel to Serbian clubs, coaches and players such as: Walter Zenga, Zdenek Zeman, Slavisa Stojanovic, Stephen Appiah, Eric Djemba Djemba, etc.

In 2008, Dragović participated as goalkeeper and worked in organization of Free Kick Masters tournament where football stars competed in free kick taking.

References

Footballers from Belgrade
Living people
FK Sarajevo players
Inter Milan players
FK Obilić players
A.C. ChievoVerona players
FK Zemun players
Serbian footballers
1982 births
Association football goalkeepers